Wieruszów may refer to the following places in Poland:
Wieruszów, a town in Łódź Voivodeship (central Poland)
Wieruszów, Lower Silesian Voivodeship, a village in Świdnica County, Lower Silesian Voivodeship (SW Poland)